{{DISPLAYTITLE:C31H46O2}}
The molecular formula C31H46O2 (molar mass: 450.69 g/mol, exact mass: 450.3498 u) may refer to:

 Phytomenadione, also known as phylloquinone or Vitamin K1

Chemical formulas